Afghanistan national amateur boxing athletes represents Afghanistan in regional, continental and world amateur boxing tournaments and matches sanctioned by the International Boxing Association (AIBA).

Olympics

2004 Athens Olympics

One amateur boxer represented Afghanistan in this edition of the Olympiad. He was defeated in round of 32 bout.

Entry list
 Basharmal Sultani (Welterweight)

Asian Games

2006 Doha Asian Games

Four amateur boxers represented Afghanistanin this edition of the Asiad. This country is ranked 15th in the medal tally table with no medals.

Entry list
 Mohammad Naim Amini (Light Welterweight)
 Shahzada Hassan (Featherhweight)
 Mohammad Sadeq Mirzaei (Light Heavyweight)
 Rohullah Mustafa (Bantamweight)
 Asadullah Azad (Light Heavyweight)

References

 
Amateur boxing